Robbery Under Arms is a 1890 play by Alfred Dampier and Garnet Walch based on the novel of the same name by Rolf Boldrewood.

History
In 1889 Dampier secured the exclusive rights to prepare a dramatization of the Boldrewood novel.

This was not an easy task, as the novel is mostly first person descriptive, with very little dialogue, and great sections had to be omitted, notably the opening chapter, in which "Captain Starlight" takes 2000 head of stolen cattle overland from country New South Wales to Adelaide.

The play premiered on March 1, 1890, following Walch's dramatization of Victor Hugo's Count of Monte Cristo.

Opening night 
The play was staged on 1 March 1890 at the Alexandra Theatre, Melbourne, which Dampier had on a long lease. T. A. Browne and family were guests of honour in a stage box.
The following were principal players that evening:
Alfred Dampier as Captain Starlight 
Walter E. Baker as Dick Marston, his loyal lieutenant
Watkin Wynne as Jim Marston, the amiable reluctant outlaw
Edmund Holloway as Ben Marston
Lily Dampier as Aileen Marston
Alfred Boothman as George Storefield, an industrious settler
Carrie Bilton as Billy the Boy
Harry Stoneham as the cold-blooded villain Dick Moran
J. B. Atholwood as Warrigal, the Aboriginal hero
Katherine Russell as the vengeful Kate Morrison
Julia Merton as elderly spinster Euphrosyne Aspen, a comic character
J. Caesar, as trooper Maginnis, another comic character
Reg Rede, trooper O'Hara, also a comic character
Six years later the play had evolved somewhat with a couple of new characters but very few cast changes:
F. C. Appleton as Sir Ferdinand Merringer
Charles Field as Inspector Goring
George Buller as trooper O'Hara
Belcher as trooper Maginnis
Alfred Rolfe as Dick Marston
Herbert Forrest as Jim Marston

Notes

References 

Australian plays adapted into films
1890 plays